The Mecsek Coal Formation is a Jurassic geologic formation in Hungary. Indeterminate fossil ornithischian tracks have been reported from the formation.

Vertebrate paleofauna

Dinosaurs 
Indeterminate sauropod remains once misattributed to the Cetiosauridae are present in the province of Kómlo, Hungary.

See also 
 List of dinosaur-bearing rock formations
 List of stratigraphic units with ornithischian tracks
 Indeterminate ornithischian tracks

References

Bibliography 

 
  * 
 

Geologic formations of Hungary
Jurassic System of Europe
Hettangian Stage
Sinemurian Stage
Pliensbachian Stage
Siltstone formations
Coal formations
Coal in Hungary
Fluvial deposits
Ichnofossiliferous formations
Paleontology in Hungary